Paralpenus ugandae is a moth of the family Erebidae. It was described by George Hampson in 1916. It is found in Eritrea, Kenya and Uganda.

References

Spilosomina
Moths described in 1916